The 1865 United Kingdom general election saw the Liberals, led by Lord Palmerston, increase their large majority over the Earl of Derby's Conservatives to 80. The Whig Party changed its name to the Liberal Party between the previous election and this one.

Palmerston died in October the same year and was succeeded by Lord John Russell as Prime Minister. Despite the Liberal majority, the party was divided by the issue of further parliamentary reform, and Russell resigned after being defeated in a vote in the House of Commons in 1866, leading to minority Conservative governments under Derby and then Benjamin Disraeli.

This was the last United Kingdom general election until 2019 where a party increased its majority after having been returned to office at the previous election with a reduced majority.

Corruption
The 1865 general election was regarded by contemporaries as being a generally dull contest nationally, which exaggerated the degree of corruption within individual constituencies. In his PhD thesis, Cornelius O'Leary described The Times as having reported "the testimony is unanimous that in the General Election of 1865 there was more profuse and corrupt expenditure than was ever known before". As a result of allegations of corruption, 50 election petitions were lodged, of which 35 were pressed to a trial; 13 ended with the elected MP being unseated. In four cases a Royal Commission had to be appointed because of widespread corrupt practices in the constituency.

As a result, when he became Prime Minister in 1867, Benjamin Disraeli announced that he would introduce a new method for election petition trials, which were then determined by a committee of the House of Commons, resulting in the Parliamentary Elections Act 1868, whereby two Judges of the Court of Common Pleas, Exchequer of Pleas or Queen's Bench would be designated to try election petitions with full judicial salaries.

Constituencies 
Many new constituencies were used for this election:

 Northern West Riding of Yorkshire
 Southern West Riding of Yorkshire

Results

|-  class="sortbottom" style="font-weight: bold; text-align: right; background: #f2f2f2;"
! colspan="2" style="padding-left: 1.5em; text-align: left;" | Total
| 
| 658
| 
| 
| +4
| 100
| 100
| 854,856
| 
|}

Regional results

Great Britain

England

Scotland

Wales

Ireland

Universities

Source:

See also
 List of MPs elected in the 1865 United Kingdom general election
 1865 United Kingdom general election in Ireland

References

Sources and further reading

 
 
 
 
 
 

 Roberts, Matthew. "Election Cartoons and Political Communication In Victorian England" Cultural & Social History (2013) 10#3 pp 369–395, covers 1860 to 1890.

External links
 Spartacus: Political Parties and Election Results

 
1865 elections in the United Kingdom
General election
1865
July 1865 events